() or  is a residential suburb in the north-western part of the Brussels-Capital Region, Belgium. It belongs to the municipality of the City of Brussels and is mostly identified by the Belgian postal code: 1020. Prior to 1921, it was a separate municipality.

Toponymy

Etymology
The name Laeken derives from the Germanic Lacha or Lache ("water", "lake"), because the Molenbeek brook at the time formed a network of ponds at this height. The oldest mention of the village is in a diploma from 1080, where the name Gilbert de Lacha appears. There is also the mention Lachus in 1117.

Main sights

Royal Palace

The Royal Palace of Laeken, official home of the Belgian Royal Family, is situated in Laeken. The palace was built in 1782–1784 by the French architect and urbanist Charles de Wailly. It was partly destroyed by fire in 1890, and was rebuilt and extended by the architect Alphonse Balat. The French architect Charles Girault gave it its present outline in 1902. It has been the royal residence since the accession to the throne of King Leopold I in 1831. The former King Albert II and Queen Paola live in the Belvédère, a château on the grounds of the park surrounding the palace, while King Philippe and Queen Mathilde live in the main palace.

Royal Greenhouses

The Royal Domain also contains the large Royal Greenhouses of Laeken, a set of monumental dome-shaped constructions, accessible to the public only a few days a year. They were designed by Alphonse Balat, with the cooperation of the young Victor Horta.

Church of Our Lady

A little south of the Royal Palace, one can find the neo-Gothic Church of Our Lady, initially built as a mausoleum for Queen Louise-Marie, wife of Leopold I, whose children included King Leopold II and Empress Carlota of Mexico. The architect was Joseph Poelaert, designer of the famed Brussels' Palace of Justice. The church contains the Royal Crypt, where the members of the Belgian Royal Family are buried. In February each year, a memorial mass for deceased members of the Royal Family is held at the church. In the nave of the church, the tomb of Cardinal Joseph Cardijn can also be found.

Laeken Cemetery

Laeken Cemetery, located behind the church, is known as the Belgian Père Lachaise, after the famous cemetery in Paris, because it used to be the burial place of the rich and the famous. It harbours the graves of, among others, the symbolist painter Fernand Khnopff and the opera singer Maria Malibran, and also features an original cast of The Thinker (Le Penseur), by Auguste Rodin.

Chinese Pavilion and Japanese Tower

A little north of the Royal Palace stand the Chinese Pavilion and the Japanese Tower. The Chinese Pavilion was commissioned by Leopold II and now forms part of the Museums of the Far East. The rooms of the Chinese Pavilion are designed in  chinoiserie Louis XIV and Louis XVI styles. They are decorated with Chinese motifs, chinaware and silverware. The Japanese Tower is a pagoda (known as a Tō), inspired by a construction Leopold II saw at the Paris Exposition of 1900. Leopold II asked his architect Alexandre Marcel to build him a similar one in Laeken.

Other places of interest
Other places of interest in Laeken include the King Baudouin Stadium, the Bruparck entertainment park (with the Atomium, Mini-Europe miniature park and Kinepolis cinema), the Centenary Palace, home to the Brussels Exhibition Centre (Brussels Expo), as well as the Port of Brussels, next to which the Monument to Work by Constantin Meunier was erected.

The impressive buildings of the former goods station of Tour & Taxis and the surrounding area border the neighbourhood, and will be turned into residences, as well as commercial enterprises.

Areas
 Heysel/Heizel 
 Royal Domain of Laeken and Laeken Park
 Mutsaard 
 Old Laeken and Port of Brussels

Notable inhabitants

 Jeanne-Paule Marie "Jeannine" Deckers (1933–1985), singer, songwriter, and a nun, better known as 'The Singing Nun'
 Annie Cordy (1928–2020), actress and singer
 Étienne-François Letourneur (1751–1817), French lawyer, soldier, and politician of the French Revolution, died there.
 Xavier Mellery (1845–1921), Symbolist painter, draughtsman, illustrator and decorative artist
 Paul Ooghe (1899–2001), World War I veteran
 Belgian Royal Family, including King Philippe, Queen Mathilde and their children
 Stromae (Paul Van Haver) (b. 1985), singer-songwriter
 Freddy Thielemans (1944–2022), politician and former mayor of the City of Brussels

References

Notes

External links

 Official website 

Neighbourhoods of Brussels
City of Brussels
Former municipalities of the Brussels-Capital Region
Populated places in Belgium